Jared John Staal (born August 21, 1990) is a Canadian former professional ice hockey player and current coach. He is currently an assistant coach for the AHL's Charlotte Checkers.

Staal moved into coaching after retiring from playing in 2017, following a season with the Edinburgh Capitals of the Elite Ice Hockey League (EIHL). Staal was previously a member of the Carolina Hurricanes of the National Hockey League (NHL). He is the younger brother of Eric Staal of the Florida Panthers, Marc Staal of the Florida Panthers, and Jordan Staal of the Carolina Hurricanes. He is also the cousin of Jeff Heerema, formerly of the Nottingham Panthers.

Playing career
Staal grew up in his hometown of Thunder Bay, Ontario playing 'AAA' hockey for the Thunder Bay Kings. He was drafted in the first round of the 2006 Ontario Hockey League (OHL) Priority Selection Draft by the Sudbury Wolves (11th overall).

Staal played the 2007–08 season with the Wolves. He was selected by the Phoenix Coyotes in the second-round of the 2008 NHL Entry Draft, 49th overall. He is the only member of the Staal brothers not to be taken in the first round of the NHL Entry Draft and the only one not to have been drafted by an Eastern Conference team. He is the only right-handed shooter of all four brothers.

On April 3, 2009, Staal signed an amateur tryout contract with the San Antonio Rampage, the AHL affiliate of the Coyotes. He appeared in five games for the Rampage in 2009, however he was sent back to the Sudbury Wolves for the remainder of the season.

On May 13, 2010, the Carolina Hurricanes acquired his rights from the Phoenix Coyotes in exchange for a fifth-round draft pick. On May 14, 2010, the Hurricanes signed Staal to a three-year entry-level contract. To start the 2010–11 season, he was assigned to the Hurricanes AHL affiliate, the Charlotte Checkers of the AHL. Struggling to gain ice time after 12 games, on November 19, 2010, Staal was reassigned to their ECHL affiliate, the Florida Everblades, but was later recalled. For the 2011–12 season, Staal returned to the Charlotte Checkers. On March 12, 2012, the Hurricanes loaned him to the Boston Bruins' affiliate Providence Bruins of the AHL for the remainder of the 2011–12 season.

After scoring 3 goals and 4 assists in 52 games with Charlotte in 2012–13, Staal made his NHL debut with the Hurricanes on April 25, 2013 against the New York Rangers.  He was in the Hurricanes' starting line-up for the game, starting on a forward line with brothers Eric and Jordan.

After five seasons within the Hurricanes organization, Staal was released as a free agent in the summer. With limited NHL or AHL interest, Staal signed a one-year deal with the Florida Everblades of the ECHL on October 7, 2015. Prior to the 2015–16 season, he was traded by the Everblades to the South Carolina Stingrays on October 15, 2015.

On July 4, 2016, Staal signed abroad to a one-year contract with the Edinburgh Capitals of the EIHL.

Coaching career
In June 2018, Staal retired from playing and signed a contract to become an assistant coach with OHA Edmonton of the Canadian Sport School Hockey League.

Staal was named the fifth assistant coach in Orlando Solar Bears history on August 8, 2019. He took on the title of associate coach for the 2021–22 ECHL season, remaining with the team until 2022 when Orlando head coach Drake Berehowsky left his position.

In August 2022, Staal was named an assistant coach at AHL side Charlotte Checkers. Staal had spent five seasons as a player with the Checkers between 2010 and 2015.

Career statistics

See also
Staal brothers
List of family relations in the NHL

References

External links

1990 births
Living people
Arizona Coyotes draft picks
Canadian ice hockey right wingers
Canadian people of Dutch descent
Carolina Hurricanes players
Charlotte Checkers (2010–) players
Edinburgh Capitals players
Florida Everblades players
Ice hockey people from Ontario
Providence Bruins players
San Antonio Rampage players
South Carolina Stingrays players
Sportspeople from Thunder Bay
Sudbury Wolves players
Jared
Canadian expatriate ice hockey players in the United States
Canadian expatriate ice hockey players in Scotland